The Natchez Micropolitan Statistical Area is a micropolitan area that consists of Adams County, Mississippi and Concordia Parish, Louisiana. As of the 2000 census, the μSA had a population of 54,587 (though a July 1, 2009 estimate placed the population at 49,711).

Counties
Adams County, Mississippi
Concordia Parish, Louisiana

Communities

Incorporated places
Clayton, Louisiana 
Ferriday, Louisiana
Natchez, Mississippi (Principal City)
Ridgecrest, Louisiana
Vidalia, Louisiana

Census-designated places
Minorca, Louisiana
Monterey, Louisiana
Spokane, Louisiana
West Ferriday, Louisiana

Unincorporated places
Acme, Louisiana
Cannonsburg, Mississippi
Deer Park, Louisiana
Eva, Louisiana
Frogmore, Louisiana
Morgantown, Mississippi
New Era, Louisiana
Pine Ridge, Mississippi
Shaw, Louisiana
Sibley, Mississippi
Stanton, Mississippi
Washington, Mississippi
Wildsville, Louisiana

Demographics
As of the census of 2000, there were 54,587 people, 21,198 households, and 14,839 families residing within the μSA. The racial makeup of the μSA was 51.49% White, 47.18% African American, 0.15% Native American, 0.24% Asian, 0.01% Pacific Islander, 0.34% from other races, and 0.59% from two or more races. Hispanic or Latino of any race were 1.05% of the population.

The median income for a household in the μSA was $23,988, and the median income for a family was $29,110. Males had a median income of $28,857 versus $19,531 for females. The per capita income for the μSA was $13,872.

See also
List of cities in Mississippi
List of towns and villages in Mississippi
List of census-designated places in Mississippi
Louisiana census statistical areas
List of cities, towns, and villages in Louisiana
List of census-designated places in Louisiana
List of United States metropolitan areas

References

 
Geography of Adams County, Mississippi
Geography of Concordia Parish, Louisiana